The women's 500 metres race of the 2016 World Single Distances Speed Skating Championships was held on 13 February 2016.

Results
The first run was started at 17:01 and the second run at 18:36.

References

Women's 500 metres
World